Habronattus hirsutus is a species of jumping spider (family Salticidae). It is found in North America.

References

External links

Salticidae
Spiders described in 1888